Zachary Higgins Clark (born April 10, 1983) is an American former professional baseball player. He played in Major League Baseball for the Baltimore Orioles in 2013.

Career
Clark graduated from Newark High School in Newark, Delaware, in 2001. He then attended the University of Maryland, Baltimore County (UMBC), where he played college baseball for the UMBC Retrievers.

Baltimore Orioles
He went undrafted after graduating in 2006, and signed with the Baltimore Orioles as a free agent, receiving a $1,000 signing bonus. By 2010, Clark was promoted to the Norfolk Tides of the Class AAA International League, the highest level of minor league baseball.

Clark posted a strong breakout season in 2012 for the Bowie Baysox of the Class AA Eastern League and Norfolk, posting a 15-7 win–loss record with a 2.79 earned run average between the two teams. The Orioles added Clark to their 40-man roster after the 2012 season.

Clark began the 2013 season with Norfolk. On May 1, 2013, Clark was called up to the Orioles, where he was expected to be a part of the bullpen. Clark made his major league debut that same night against the Mariners in Seattle, coming on in relief of Wei-Yin Chen in the bottom of the 5th inning. He went  innings in his debut, allowing three hits and three earned runs. He was designated for assignment on May 4, 2013. On May 6, he was outrighted to Bowie, where he began developing a knuckleball. He experienced a hamstring injury, and struggled for the remainder of the season. Clark became a free agent at the end of the season, and signed a new minor league contract with the Orioles.

The Orioles did not assign Clark to a minor league affiliate at the start of the 2014 season, as he worked on his knuckleball in extended spring training. In June, the Orioles opted not to assign Clark to the Aberdeen Ironbirds of the Class A-Short Season New York–Penn League, and instead released him.

Camden Riversharks
Clark signed with the Camden Riversharks of the unaffiliated Atlantic League of Professional Baseball a few days later, and scrapped the knuckleball.

Scouting career 
After retiring from professional baseball, Clark was hired as a scout for the Houston Astros. He was let go in 2017 as part of restructuring by the organization.

He was soon after hired by the Tampa Bay Rays' scouting department, and currently serves as an Area Supervisor scout.

References

External links

Living people
Baseball players from Wilmington, Delaware
Major League Baseball pitchers
Baltimore Orioles players
UMBC Retrievers baseball players
Bluefield Orioles players
Aberdeen IronBirds players
Frederick Keys players
Delmarva Shorebirds players
Norfolk Tides players
Bowie Baysox players
Gulf Coast Orioles players
1983 births
Camden Riversharks players